The 2013–14 Bulgarian Hockey League season was the 62nd season of the Bulgarian Hockey League, the top level of ice hockey in Bulgaria. Four teams participated in the league, and HC CSKA Sofia won the championship.

Participating teams
HC Levski Sofia withdrew from the league due to financial issues and were replaced in the competition by the national junior team.

 HC NSA Sofia
 HC Slavia Sofia
 HC CSKA Sofia
 Bulgaria men's national junior ice hockey team

Regular season
The championship was cancelled in mid-January after only eight games had been played in total. HC CSKA Sofia was recognized as Bulgarian champions.

External links
 Season on eurohockey.com

Bulgarian Hockey League seasons
Bul